Prabha may refer to:

People with the given name
 Prabha Atre (born 1932), Indian classical singer
 Prabha Bannabilaya (1885–1948), princess of Siam
 Prabha Bharti (d. 2000s), one of the first Indian women qawaali singer (fl. 1960s-1990s)
 Prabha Kiran Jain (born 1963), Indian poet and author
 Prabha Ranatunge (born 1926), Sri Lankan female radio personality 
 Prabha Rau (1935–2010),  Indian politician
 Prabha (actress), South Indian actress
 Prabha Sinha (born 1950), Indian actress
 Prabha Thakur (born 1949), Indian politician

People with the surname
 B. Prabha (1933–2001), Indian artist
 Rama Prabha (born 1947), Indian actress

Other
 Andhra Prabha, a Telugu daily newspaper launched in 1938
 Kannada Prabha, a morning daily newspaper from the house of The New Indian Express Group

See also
 Prabhas (born 1979), Indian film actor in Telugu Cinema